Jeff Schofer (born 26 March 1943) is a New Zealand cricketer. He played in two first-class matches for Wellington in 1969/70.

See also
 List of Wellington representative cricketers

References

External links
 

1943 births
Living people
New Zealand cricketers
Wellington cricketers
Cricketers from Lower Hutt